Holless Wilbur Allen (July 12, 1909 Stilwell, Kansas – June 28, 1979 Billings, Missouri) was the inventor of the compound bow.

Allen revolutionized the archery industry worldwide with the invention and patent of the compound bow in the 1960s.
In the early 1960s, the USA experienced an increased interest in bow hunting. Holless Wilbur Allen was mechanically minded and sawed the ends off a conventional recurve bow and then added pulleys to each end. With the help of bowmaker Tom Jennings, he became the first manufacturer of compound bows. Of the five bow manufacturing companies to retain the right to manufacture compound bows utilizing Allen's design and patent, PSE (Precision Shooting Equipment) is the only survivor. PSE is the parent company of Browning Archery and the former Archery Research (AR).

Allen was born in Stillwell, Johnson County, Kansas and lived in Kansas City, Missouri. He moved to Billings, Missouri in 1967. He died as the results of injuries suffered in a car accident.

Recognition & Awards 
Archery Hall of Fame & Museum: Class of 2010 Inductee, Innovator, Inventor, Contributor to the Sport

References

 The Compound Bow
 

Archery
1909 births
1979 deaths
People from Johnson County, Kansas
People from Kansas City, Missouri
People from Billings, Missouri